HUMHOT is a database of human meiotic recombination hot spot DNA sequences.

See also
  meiotic recombination

References

External links
 http://www.jncasr.ac.in/humhot.

Biological databases
Human genetics
DNA repair